Robert Hewat (18 October 1863 — 17 November 1953) was a New Zealand cricketer who played for Otago. He was born and died in Oamaru.

Hewat made a single first-class appearance for Otago, during the 1889–90 season, against the touring New South Wales team. He scored a duck in each innings and took one wicket for 16 from 14 overs, as Otago lost the match by an innings margin. In the 1900-01 North Otago Cricket Association season, playing for Oamaru A, he led the batting and bowling averages and aggregates, with 187 runs at an average of 23.37 and 48 wickets at an average of 2.9.

Hewat married Alice Mary Colwell Little in Dunedin in December 1892.

See also
 List of Otago representative cricketers

References

External links
Robert Hewat at CricketArchive 

1863 births
1953 deaths
Cricketers from Oamaru
New Zealand cricketers
Otago cricketers